Michelle Shields is an American actress, model and singer. She is primarily known for her roles in various horror films including starring as Elizabeth in Frankenstein: Day of the Beast, acting opposite of horror legend Linnea Quigley in Post Mortem America, 2021 in a featured role, appearing in Sister Mary, and having on screen roles in blockbusters such as The Dark Knight.

Shields has worked with the likes of Lloyd Kaufman, Larry Thomas, James Vallo, and Bruce Vilanch. She also does work in television and stage. She also stars in several comics produced by Comic Book Divas. Shields is also a multi-time featured guest at the annual Days of the Dead
 convention, the Wheaton All Night conventions and Days of Terror, as well as many others.

She was recently cast as the lead in the feature film Llorona and a featured role in the remake of Night of the Living Dead.

Selected filmography

 Voices From the Graves (2006) as Crystal 
 Timeserver (2007) as Dot
 Fred Claus (2007)
 The Dark Knight (2008)
 Isle of the Damned (2008)
 Cannibal Island Holocaust (2008) as Pucci
 Working Title (2009)
 Public Enemies (2009)
 Not Another B Movie (2010) as Suzie the PA 
 Mountain Mafia (2010) as Lilly 
 Special Day (2010)
 Post Mortem, America 2021 (2011) as Suze 
 Sister Mary (2011) as Detective Emma Sharp 
 Chasing Hollywood (2011)
 Exile (2011) as Professor Loomis 
 Illusion (2011)
 Frankenstein: Day of the Beast (2011) as Elizabeth 
 Dark Worlds: Slasher (2012) as Snow White, Slasher, Allison Smith 
 Divorced Dudes (2012) as Medina 
 Night of the Living Dead (2012)

References

External links

American film actresses
Living people
21st-century American actresses
Actresses from Illinois
Female models from Illinois
Year of birth missing (living people)